Dilnoza Abdusalimova (born ) is a Uzbekistani female artistic gymnast, representing her nation at international competitions. 

She competed at world championships, including the 2013 World Artistic Gymnastics Championships in Antwerp, Belgium.

References

External links
 Profile at thegymter.net
 https://www.youtube.com/watch?v=HZ3gc83bW10
 https://database.fig-gymnastics.com/public/gymnasts/biography/25835/false?backUrl=
 https://www.shutterstock.com/search/dilnoza+abdusalimova
 http://www.the-sports.org/dilnoza-abdusalimova-gymnastics-spf200055.html

1995 births
Living people
Uzbekistani female artistic gymnasts
Place of birth missing (living people)
Gymnasts at the 2010 Summer Youth Olympics
Gymnasts at the 2014 Asian Games
Asian Games competitors for Uzbekistan
21st-century Uzbekistani women